The Palaeodictyopteroidea or Paleodictyopterida are an extinct superorder of Palaeozoic beaked insects, characterised by unique mouthparts consisting of 5 stylets.  They represent the first important terrestrial herbivores, and the first major group of herbivorous insects.  They appear during the Middle Carboniferous (late Serpukhovian or early Bashkirian) and continue through to the Late Permian.  This large and diverse group includes 50% of all known Paleozoic insects. Palaeodictyopteroidea nymphs possessed  movable wing pads and appear to have been able to perform simple flapping flight.

References

External links
Paleodictyopteroidea at the Tree of Life project
 Palaeodictyopteroidea by Nina Sinitshenkova, 2002

 
Carboniferous insects
Permian insects
Pennsylvanian first appearances
Lopingian extinctions
Insect superorders
Taxa named by Boris Rohdendorf
Pterygota